St John Berchmans College is a Roman Catholic secondary school founded by the Society of Jesus in Brussels. It is situated close to Chapel Church and is named after John Berchmans.

History
The school was founded by the Jesuits on 16 July 1604 and had 400 students that same year. However, in 1773, the Jesuits were ordered to cease providing educational services by Pope Clement XIV. The school was closed on 20 September 1773. The furniture was confiscated and sold and in 1816, the building became a court house. Later, the Belgian state archives were housed in the building. In 1891, the archives were moved and the building was razed to make way for a road.

In 1814, the Jesuits returned to Belgium and opened the French-speaking St Michael's College 19 years later in the Chapel Church area of the city. In 1905, the expanding population forced the Jesuits to not only expand the college but to also look for a location for a new college. In 1908, the college on Ursuline Street was renamed as St John Berchmans College and the new college in the Etterbeek part of the city became St Michael's College. In 1912, Saint John Berchmans Church was opened next to St Michael's College.

Starting in the late 1930s, a shift in language was made which would result in St John Berchmans College speaking Dutch and English and the French-speaking section of the college being transferred to St Michael's College.

Notable former students
Former students of the college include:

 Henri Carton de Wiart
 Pieter De Crem
 Paul De Grauwe
 Lorenzo Gatto
 Jan Grauls
 Felix De Laet, also known as Lost Frequencies
 Bart Laeremans
 Hubert Pierlot
 Prince Amedeo of Belgium, Archduke of Austria-Este
 Princess Elisabeth, Duchess of Brabant
 Prince Emmanuel of Belgium

 Prince Gabriel of Belgium
 Princess Eléonore of Belgium
 Prince Joachim of Belgium, Archduke of Austria-Este
 Princess Maria Laura of Belgium, Archduchess of Austria-Este
 Princess Laetitia Maria of Belgium, Archduchess of Austria-Este
 Princess Luisa Maria of Belgium, Archduchess of Austria-Este
 Eric Van Rompuy
 Herman Van Rompuy
 Piet Van Waeyenberge
 Youri Tielemans

See also
 List of Jesuit sites in Belgium
 Archdiocese of Mechelen–Brussels

References

External links
 St John Berchmans College site

Secondary schools in Brussels
Jesuit secondary schools in Belgium